Thomas William Cochrane  (born May 14, 1953) is a Canadian musician best known as the frontman for the rock band Red Rider and for his work as a solo singer-songwriter. Cochrane has won eight Juno Awards. He is a member of the Canadian Music Hall of Fame, an officer of the Order of Canada, and has an honorary doctorate from Brandon University. In September 2009, he was inducted onto the Canadian Walk of Fame.

Life and career

Red Rider
After meeting at the El Mocambo tavern in Toronto, Cochrane joined the Canadian rock band Red Rider in 1978 and served as their lead singer and main songwriter for more than ten years. Red Rider included Ken Greer, Jeff Jones, Peter Boynton and Rob Baker. Bruce Allen managed the band from their debut until 1985. Cochrane recorded six studio albums with Red Rider plus a live album, a best-of album, and a box set. By 1986, the band was billed as "Tom Cochrane & Red Rider". He would later refer to this period of his career as a stretch of "manageable success" before the release of Mad Mad World.

In 2002, Cochrane reunited with his former Red Rider bandmates Greer and Jones and continues to perform with them.

Solo career
Already a household name in Canada from his time with Red Rider, Cochrane launched his solo career in 1991 with the release of the song "Life Is a Highway". The single became a global success and was followed by the release of his Mad Mad World album, which would reach the six million mark in worldwide sales. The albums Ragged Ass Road, Songs of a Circling Spirit, X-Ray Sierra and No Stranger followed.

Today 
An avid golfer, pilot, and hockey buff, Cochrane lives in Oakville, Ontario, with his wife Kathleene. He spends summers at his cottage/studio on the shores of Georgian Bay in Northern Ontario and winters part-time at his home outside of Austin, Texas. Cochrane and his wife have two daughters, Cody and Evanne. Cochrane continues to tour and perform in Canada. In 2006, the group Rascal Flatts charted in the top 10 of the Hot 100 with a cover of "Life Is a Highway", which they recorded for the Pixar film Cars. Although the song was not originally released to country radio, several country stations began playing the song, causing it to chart within the top 20 of Hot Country Songs. Chris Ledoux also had a country hit with "Life Is A Highway".

In October, 2016, Cochrane celebrated the twenty-fifth anniversary of his Mad Mad World album with an announcement of the release of a special edition of the album, featuring a demo recording of "Love is a Highway", the working title of "Life is a Highway", as well as a second disc featuring a live performance from a 1992 Chicago stop on the tour supporting the album. In 2017, he toured with Meghan Patrick and Nice Horse, and released a coffee table book about the album.

The Manitoba provincial government recently named a section of a highway near his hometown of Lynn Lake after the hit "Life Is a Highway". A stretch of Highway 391 is being renamed Tom Cochrane's Life is a Highway. This is part of a series of Honours for the musician's influence on Canadian music.

Honours 
Canadian Music Hall of Fame induction: Cochrane was inducted into the Canadian Music Hall of Fame in 2003 for outstanding contribution to the greater recognition of Canadian music. The ceremony took place April 5, 2003, at Casino du Lac-Leamy in Gatineau, Quebec. The following night, Cochrane was honoured for his induction in a speech by Jeff Healey at the Juno Awards at the Corel Centre (now Canadian Tire Centre in Ottawa). Cochrane closed the show by performing a medley of his hits and was joined onstage by host Shania Twain for the final song, "Life Is a Highway".

Order of Canada: In April 2008, Cochrane received one of the highest honours for a Canadian citizen when he was invested as an officer of the Order of Canada (the level companion of the Order of Canada is the highest honour, and several people originally invested as officers have been promoted to companions for continued contributions to charity and the arts, among other fields). Cochrane was honoured for a lifetime of charity work, his contribution to the arts and for being unabashedly Canadian.

Canada's Walk of Fame: In September 2009, Cochrane was inducted onto Canada's Walk of Fame. The induction was highlighted by a two-hour nationally televised gala at Toronto's Four Season's Center for the Performing Arts. Anne Murray hosted the event which also included the inductions of Kim Cattrall, Raymond Burr, Blue Rodeo, Dsquared2, Howie Mandel, Robert Munsch and Chantal Petitclerc.

Honorary colonel: In November 2007, Cochrane was formally invested as an honorary colonel (HCol) by the Royal Canadian Air Force's 409 "Nighthawks" Tactical Fighter Squadron. As part of his investiture weekend, Cochrane experienced his second flight in a CF-18.

Honorary doctorate: In May 2005, Cochrane received an honorary doctorate from Brandon University in Brandon, Manitoba. In addition, musician James Ehnes, journalist Henry Champ and actress Shirley Douglas received honorary doctorates from the university at the spring convocation held May 28, 2005.

Canadian Music Industry Hall of Fame  Cochrane was inducted on May 9, 2014, Gil Moore formerly of the band Triumph made the presentation.

Canadian Music Industry Humanitarian Award: In March 2005, Cochrane received the Humanitarian Award at the Canadian Music Industry Association's (CMIA) gala dinner in Toronto during the annual Canadian Music Week Festival.

Allan Waters Humanitarian Award: In April 2013, Cochrane received the award at the 2013 Juno Awards gala dinner.

Henry H. Knowles Humanitarian Award: In May 2014, Cochrane received this award from OPSEU.

Order of Manitoba: In July 2015 Cochrane received the Order Of Manitoba.

On October 31, 2016, the provincial legislature of Manitoba announced a 322-kilometre section of PR 391, Manitoba's premium highway, connecting Lynn Lake and Thompson would be renamed Tom Cochrane's Life Is A Highway.

Discography

Albums

Solo
 1974: Hang On to Your Resistance
 1975: My Pleasure Is My Business (soundtrack)
 1991: Mad Mad World
 1995: Ragged Ass Road
 1999: Xray Sierra
 2006: No Stranger
 2015: Take It Home
 2016: Mad Mad World (Deluxe Edition with live disc)

Compilation albums (solo)
 1997: Songs of a Circling Spirit

With Red Rider
 1979: Don't Fight It
 1981: As Far as Siam
 1983: Neruda
 1984: Breaking Curfew
 1986: Tom Cochrane and Red Rider (as Tom Cochrane & Red Rider)
 1988: Victory Day (as Tom Cochrane & Red Rider)
 1989: The Symphony Sessions  (as Tom Cochrane & Red Rider)

Compilation albums (with Red Rider)
 1987: Over 60 Minutes with Red Rider
 1993: Ashes to Diamonds (3-CD boxed set)
 2002: Anthology 1980–1987
 2002: Trapeze: The Collection

Singles

Solo

With Red Rider

Awards

See also

Music of Canada
Canadian rock
Canadian Music Hall of Fame
List of diamond-certified albums in Canada

References

External links
 
 The Official Music website
 The Tom Cochrane website
 
 

1953 births
20th-century Canadian male singers
Canadian Music Hall of Fame inductees
Canadian rock singers
Canadian male singer-songwriters
Juno Award for Single of the Year winners
Living people
Members of the Order of Manitoba
Musicians from Manitoba
Musicians from Toronto
Officers of the Order of Canada
People from Etobicoke
People from Oakville, Ontario
Red Rider members
Writers from Toronto
Juno Award for Album of the Year winners
Juno Award for Songwriter of the Year winners
Juno Award for Artist of the Year winners
21st-century Canadian male singers